François Bourgeon (born 5 July 1945, Paris) is a French comics artist. He is author of several noted Franco-Belgian comics album series.

Biography
Bourgeon was originally educated as a master stained glass artist, but difficulties in finding employment and a passion for drawing altered his course onto a different career. Getting illustrations published in magazines from 1971 eventually led him to pursue graphic storytelling and to develop his craft over the next few years. His first major comic work became the two first outings in the medieval series , created for publisher Glénat Editions who released the two titles directly in comic album format. These two titles already foreshadowed his later, more grim medieval epos  (The Companions of the Dusk), both thematically as well as art-wise. His graphic novels have ranged from nautical and medieval historical fiction to science fiction, and characteristically, within settings of violence and sexuality, epic stories revolve around strong female characters. Brunelle, Isa, Mariotte and Cyann are the heroines of each their series, Brunelle et Colin, The Passagers of the Wind, The Twilight Companions and The Cyann Saga, respectively. Bourgeon is noted as a thorough researcher and his drawings, from 17th-century ships to 14th-century clothing, have a reputation for historical accuracy. For example, when working on The Passengers of the Wind, he did a vast amount of background reading, consulted academic specialists and visited the Maritime Museum in Nantes. For this series he also made scale models both of colonial architectural structures and one of the ships on which the main characters sail, in order to ensure that the dimensions and the interior layouts were correct. His time-consuming and meticulous research has resulted in that his body of work is relatively modest in comparison to the ones created by his major contemporaries such as Jean "Mœbius" Giraud, Hermann Huppen or André Juillard. He lives in Cornouaille in Brittany.

The Cyann Saga affair

When Bourgeon's usual editor since 1983, the family-owned company Casterman, was bought by the large corporation Flammarion, problems arose. Bourgeon and Lacroix claimed that Flammarion had altered the sales numbers to slow down royalty payments to the authors, and then committed other irregularities. The authors took Flammarion to court in 1999.  Flammarion countersued separately, charging the authors over failure to produce a new album of the Cyann series in less than three years.  The contract between the authors and Casterman had never specified a fixed date or time period for producing any album, but despite this, on 30 October 2001 a court decided in favor of Flammarion and ordered the authors to produce an album (the third of the series), with a fine of €1000 per each day's delay. On 27 April 2004 an appeals court finally overturned the judgment of the previous court. In the meantime these litigations had become a "cause célèbre" in France, because of the intellectual freedom questions and copyright issues they raised in literary circles. In the end, the authors got their liberty and their rights and the third album of the cycle finally came out in 2005, eight years after the previous one, through a different publishing house, Vents d'Ouest.

Nature of collaboration with Claude Lacroix

In an interview in the "Dare-Dare" program of Radio Suisse Romande, as wall as a February 2007 interview on the launch of "Les couleurs de Marcade" installment in the "Cycle de Cyann" series, François Bourgeon revealed the nature of the collaboration between him and Claude Lacroix.  For this most recent album as well as the others in the Cyann series Lacroix had the task of creating nearly all of the complex decors, natural or man made be they planets or islands, cities or buildings.  In this way he created for Bourgeon the futuristic equivalent of the thorough documentation which had always been the basis for his previous series.

Lacroix, an old friend and collaborator of Bourgeon from times pre-dating those of his other series, created the decors and many of the more important objects of the Cyann series by making sketches and drawings and paintings, and also a few solid three-dimensional models at times.  The solid model for the city in "Les couleurs de Marcade" took up several meters of space at Lacroix's home.  The process for this universe-making was always interactive and non-exclusive.  In some instances Bourgeon would choose to make himself some of those background sketches, and he would later show them to Lacroix for his opinion.  Regardless of who initiated a sketch or large drawing, the two would exchange comments at all steps as the decor went from early sketch form to finished product within the BD.

Selected bibliography

Brunelle et Colin 
(with )
1. Le vol noir (1979)
2. Yglinga (1980)

Les Passagers du vent (The Passengers of the Wind)
1. La fille sous la dunette (1980)
2. Le ponton (1980)
3. Le comptoir de Juda (1981)
4. L'heure du serpent (1982)
5. Le bois d'ébène (1984)
6. La petite fille Bois-Caïman - Livre 1 (2009)
7. La petite fille Bois-Caïman - Livre 2 (2010)
8. Le sang des cerises - Livre 1: Rue de l'Abreuvoir (2018)
9. Le sang des cerises - Livre 2: Rue des Martyrs (planned release: 2023)
HS. Les chantiers d'une aventure (1994, with Michel Thiébaut)
HS. Le chemin de l'Atchafalaya (2010, with Michel Thiébaut)

Les Compagnons du crépuscule (The Companions of the Dusk)
1. Le sortilège du bois des brumes (1983)
2. Les yeux d'étain de la ville glauque (1986)
3. Le dernier chant des Malaterre (1990)
HS Dans le sillage des sirènes (1992, with Michel Thiébaut)

Le Cycle de Cyann (The Cyann Saga)
(with Claude Lacroix)
1. La sOurce et la sOnde (1993)
2. Six saisons sur ilO (1997)
3. Aïeïa d'Aldaal (2005)
4. Les couleurs de Marcade (2007)
5. Les couloirs de l'Entretemps (2012)
6. Les aubes douces d'Aldalarann (2014)
HS. La clef des confins: D'Olh à ilO et au-delà (1997)

In English
Despite the acclaim Bourgeon has received for his work in native France and mainland Europe, virtually none of his work has seen translations into English as of 2017, save one. US publisher Catalan Communications had planned to release his medieval epos Les Compagnons du crépuscule as The Companions of the Dusk in 1991, but only the first volume of the series was released as such, as the publisher went bankrupt shortly thereafter.
1 The Companions of the Dusk: "The Spell of the Misty Forest", 48 pages, 1991, Catalan Communications,  (translation Elizabeth Bell)

Awards
 1980: Best Artist at the Angoulême International Comics Festival, France
 1985: FM-BD Award at the Angoulême International Comics Festival
 1988: nominated for Best Long Comic Strip and Best Drawing at the Haxtur Awards, Spain
 1991: Angoulême Audience Award for Le dernier chant des Malaterre 
 1998: Prix Ozone, Bande dessinée francophone for Six saisons sur IlO
 1998: Angoulême Prix Alph-Art du Public for Le Cycle de Cyann-Six saisons sur IlO

References

 Bourgeon publications in Circus and (A SUIVRE) BDoubliées 
 Bourgeon albums Bedetheque 
Footnotes

External links
 François Bourgeon biography on Casterman 
 François Bourgeon biography on Vents d'Ouest 
 François Bourgeon biography on Lambiek Comiclopedia
 History and Femininity in François Bourgeon's Les compagnons du crépuscule Article from Image & Narrative

1945 births
French comics artists
French comics writers
French speculative fiction artists
Living people
Science fiction artists
French male writers